Markus Hendrik Overmars (born 29 September 1958 in Zeist, Netherlands) is a Dutch computer scientist and teacher of game programming known for his game development application GameMaker. GameMaker lets people create computer games using a drag-and-drop interface. He is the former head of the Center for Geometry, Imaging, and Virtual Environments at Utrecht University, in the Netherlands. This research center concentrates on computational geometry and its application in areas like computer graphics, robotics, geographic information systems, imaging, multimedia, virtual environments, and games.

Overmars received his Ph.D. in 1983 from Utrecht  University under the supervision of Jan van Leeuwen, and continued to be a member of the faculty of the same university until September 2013. Overmars has published over 100 journal papers, largely on computational geometry, and is the co-author of several books including a widely used computational geometry text.

Overmars has also worked in robotics. He was the first to develop the probabilistic roadmap method in 1992, which was later independently discovered by Kavraki and Latombe in 1994. Their joint paper, Probabilistic roadmaps for path planning in high-dimensional configuration spaces, is considered one of the most influential studies in motion planning, and has been widely cited (more than 2500 times as of 2014 according to Google Scholar).

In 2011, Overmars and game designer Jochem Schut developed a snake video game called Super Snake HD as a mobile app; it was published by YoYo Games.

Overmars founded and was CTO of Tingly Games from 2012 until it was acquired by CoolGames in 2016. Tingly focused on HTML5 games and e-cards / casual games, the latter of which is called "greeting games".

He founded Quarterfall in June 2020 together with Arjan Egges. Quarterfall is a teaching product that helps teachers use formative assessment to improve the learning processes their students, compared to just assessing their performance.

He is also the original author of the XForms toolkit.

Books

 2nd ed., 2000; 3rd ed., 2008.

References

1958 births
Living people
Researchers in geometric algorithms
Dutch computer scientists
Dutch computer programmers
Roboticists
People from Zeist
Utrecht University alumni
Academic staff of Utrecht University
Software engineers